Carlos "Topy" Mamery (March 11, 1960 – December 2, 2014) was a Puerto Rican music producer, television personality and executive at Mega TV and Spanish Broadcasting System's Puerto Rico division. Mamery was a judge on the reality music competition show Idol Puerto Rico from its launch in 2011 until his death in 2014. Mamery served as a judge on Idol Puerto Rico for seasons 1 through 3. His fellow Idol Puerto Rico judges included his wife, singer and actress Yolandita Monge.

Topy Mamery was the son of disc jockey, Gilbert Mamery. His sister is comedian and television host, Gricel Mamery.

In 2014, the Puerto Rican edition of TVyNovelas tabloid magazine published photographs of Mamery kissing model, Shalimar Rivera, alleging an affair. Mamery addressed the allegations on the WAPA-TV show, "Lo Sé Todo," saying, "When one has as much time in this business, you learn how to fight battles and I've fought many...When you respond to these things, you go on a hallway with no end because then comes another one and another one and another one." Additional pictures of Mamery and Rivera were released via Univision in November 2014.

Mamery and Rivera both denied the affair, while his wife, Yolandita Monge, publicly denied the allegations against her husband, saying that their marriage was stable in an interview with Primera Hora.

His most recent television special, El Rollo de Topy, which aired on November 30, 2014, received high ratings.

Carlos Mamery suffered a massive heart attack at his home in Guaynabo, Puerto Rico, on December 2, 2014. He was taken unresponsive to a hospital, where he was pronounced dead at the age of 54. Mamery was survived by his wife, Yolandita Monge, and their child, as well as his two children from a previous marriage.

References

2014 deaths
Puerto Rican television personalities
Puerto Rican record producers
American radio executives
People from Mayagüez, Puerto Rico
1960 births